Cape Croisilles  is a cape in Madang Province, Papua New Guinea. The Croisilles languages are named after the cape.

See also
Croisilles languages

References

Headlands of Papua New Guinea